The Yancheng–Nantong high-speed railway or Yantong high-speed railway is a high-speed line between Yancheng and Nantong in China. The initial operating speed will be .

History
Construction began on 1 May 2018.

Stations

References

High-speed railway lines in China
Railway lines opened in 2020